Ross Case (born 1 November 1951) is an Australian former tennis player. His career-high singles ranking was world No. 14.

With Geoff Masters, he won two Grand Slam doubles titles: in 1974 at the Australian Open and in 1977 at Wimbledon. He was also runner-up in 1976 at Wimbledon. He played in the Australian Davis Cup team in 1971, 1972, 1976, 1978, and 1979.

Career finals

Singles 10 (5 wins / 5 losses)

Doubles 41 (20 wins / 21 losses)

References

External links
 
 
 
 

1951 births
Living people
Australian Open (tennis) champions
Australian male tennis players
Sportspeople from Toowoomba
Tennis people from Queensland
Wimbledon champions
Grand Slam (tennis) champions in men's doubles
20th-century Australian people